The 2009 Asian Women's Volleyball Championship was the fifteenth edition of the Asian Championship, a biennial international volleyball tournament organised by the Asian Volleyball Confederation (AVC) with Volleyball Federation of Vietnam (VFV). The tournament was held in Hanoi, Vietnam from 5 to 13 September 2009.

Venues
Quan Ngua Competition Hall (Hanoi)

Pools composition
The teams are seeded based on their final ranking at the 2007 Asian Women's Volleyball Championship.

* Withdrew

Preliminary round

Pool A

|}

|}

Pool B

|}

|}

Pool C

|}

|}

Pool D

|}

|}

Classification round
 The results and the points of the matches between the same teams that were already played during the preliminary round shall be taken into account for the classification round.''

Pool E

|}

|}

Pool F

|}

|}

Pool G

|}

|}

Pool H

|}

|}

Classification 13th–14th

|}

Classification 9th–12th

Semifinals

|}

11th place

|}

9th place

|}

Final round

Quarterfinals

|}

5th–8th semifinals

|}

Semifinals

|}

7th place

|}

5th place

|}

3rd place

|}

Final

|}

Final standing

Awards
MVP:  Onuma Sittirak
Best Scorer:  Kim Yeon-koung
Best Spiker:  Xue Ming
Best Blocker:  Xue Ming
Best Server:  Saori Kimura
Best Setter:  Nootsara Tomkom
Best Libero:  Wanna Buakaew

External links
Official Website

V
A
Asian women's volleyball championships
V